Walker is a populated place in Jackson Parish, Louisiana, United States.

Unincorporated communities in Jackson Parish, Louisiana
Unincorporated communities in Louisiana